Wild League is a 2019 Russian historical sports drama film is based on real events of the beginning of 20th century and the appearance of football in the Russian Empire. The brave barge hauler Varlam is being trained at an English football club and, together with the merchant-patriot Balashov, is creating the first national team in Russia, co-directed by Andrey Bogatyrev and Art Camacho.

Unusual sports on the basis of real events of the early twentieth century, Wild League has assembled an international acting team, which included Vladimir Yaglych, Adelina Gizatullina, Ivan Okhlobystin, Dmitry Nazarov, Evgeniy Koryakovskiy, Olesya Sudzilovskaya and Adrian Paul. It was released in the Russian Federation by Kinoland on October 24, 2019.

Plot 
Nizhny Novgorod Governorate, Russian Empire in 1909 year.

Based upon the real-life events of the 1910s, this extremely topical story is about a guy from the lowest social strata, who, in order to be with his beloved woman, had to leave his native land and to start his life anew in Moscow. Proved himself in a battle, he was noticed by the Englishman owning a closed soccer club, who invited him to try his hand at his team. However, soccer is an aristocratic game and the team didn't accept a barge-hauler from the Volga. Therefore, he gathered his courage, found the right people, with whom they created the Wild League consisted of street teams from Moscow. Thus, he became a leader, changing his life and the lives of people surrounding him. Varlamy replaced folk fun - battles «wall against the wall», in which perished ordinary people - with soccer. Now they're challenged by the soccer lawmakers.

Cast

Cameos
 Artem Dzyuba
 Roman Zobnin

Production 
The original screenplay was written by Roman Vladykin. The idea to make a film about the origin of football in Russia came to him in 2015. When Vladykin finished the script, he sent him to a contest at the Cinema Foundation of Russia, where he eventually won. After a while, the production company "New Time" bought out this scenario.

They started shooting the film at the end of 2016.
The picture was shot in Moscow Oblast, the village of Gorki Leninskiye, the city of Yaroslavl, the city of Kostroma and territory of the Krasnodar Krai.

References

External links 
 

2010s historical drama films
2010s sports drama films
2019 films
Films set in the Russian Empire
Films shot in Russia
Russian association football films
Russian historical drama films
Russian sports drama films
2010s Russian-language films
Films directed by Art Camacho